Stretton is a small village and civil parish in Derbyshire, England. The population of the civil parish as at the 2011 Census was 525.  It is located near the towns of Clay Cross and three and a half miles from Alfreton on the A61. The nearest waterways are the River Amber and Smithy Brook. Since 1964, Stretton has been beside Ogston Reservoir which still has the remains of a pub (Napoleon's Home) and a light railway within its depths.

The parish includes the settlement of Woolley Moor. There was once a railway station — Stretton railway station.

Stretton means "settlement on a Roman Road" (from the Old English stræt and tun). In this case the road is Ryknild Street.

See also
Listed buildings in Stretton, Derbyshire

References

External links

 Stretton at DerbyshireUK

Villages in Derbyshire
Towns and villages of the Peak District
Civil parishes in Derbyshire
North East Derbyshire District